Music from Another Room may refer to:

 Music from Another Room (EP), a 2001 EP by The Juliana Theory
 Music from Another Room (film), a 1998 romantic comedy